Harvey R. Abraham (January 15, 1895 – November 18, 1973) was an American photographic processor, real estate salesman and politician. He was a member of the Wisconsin State Assembly during the 1900s.

Early life
Abraham was born in Oshkosh, Wisconsin, educated in the public schools and graduated from Oshkosh Business College. He worked as a sheet metal construction worker before serving overseas in combat duty in the United States Army during World War I. Following his military service, he worked in photographic processing, real estate and as a travelling salesman. He was a member of the American Legion and the Benevolent and Protective Order of Elks.

Political career
Abraham was a member of the Oshkosh City Council. He served as a Republican member of the State Assembly from 1947 to 1960. While in the Assembly, he was Chairman of the Committee on Excise and Fees and a member of the Judiciary Committee and the State Natural Resources Committee.

He died on November 18, 1973, in Oshkosh.

Personal life
Abraham and his wife Jessie were married on April 3, 1926.

References

External links

Politicians from Oshkosh, Wisconsin
Republican Party members of the Wisconsin State Assembly
Military personnel from Wisconsin
United States Army soldiers
United States Army personnel of World War I
1895 births
1973 deaths
20th-century American politicians